The 1997 Tulsa Golden Hurricane football team represented the University of Tulsa during the 1997 NCAA Division I-A football season. In their tenth year under head coach David Rader, the Golden Hurricane compiled a 2–9 record.  The team's statistical leaders included quarterback John Fitzgerald with 2,003 passing yards, Charlie Higgins with 1,043 rushing yards, and Damon Savage with 1,084 receiving yards.

Schedule

Roster

References

Tulsa
Tulsa Golden Hurricane football seasons
Tulsa Golden Hurricane football